Bruno Zanin (born 9 April 1951 in Vigonovo, Veneto, Italy) is an Italian film, theatre and TV actor and writer.

Life and career
Child of farmers and the sixth of seven brothers, Zanin studied at a school run by priests up to the age of fourteen when an event occurred that made him leave (detailed in his novel, Nobody must know). After a life on the road including time in jail, he became an actor by accident when Federico Fellini chose him among thousands of young men for the role of Titta in the film Amarcord. He went on to appear in numerous films, theatre plays and television series with Italian and foreign filmmakers such as Giuseppe Ferrara, Marco Tullio Giordana, Giuliano Montaldo, Franco Brusati, Luigi Faccini, Lucian Pintilie and Lina Wertmüller. In the theatre, he has worked with Giorgio Strehler, Luca Ronconi, Marco Sciaccaluga, Gianfranco De Bosio, Sandro Sequi, and Alfredo Arias, appearing chiefly in Venetian language plays by Goldoni but also in Shakespeare's The Merchant of Venice.

In 2007 he published his first novel, an autobiographical work titled Nobody must know. The book obtained special mention at the Città di Latisana per il Nord Est, an Italian literary awards event. The novel was published in Spanish by Trotta editorial (Madrid) as Que no se entere nadie.

Zanin has two sons, Francesco and Fiorenzo. He lives in a log cabin in the woods at Vanzone con San Carlo, a mountain village below Monte Rosa, Piedmont.

Filmography

TV theatre
1979: The Merchant of Venice, by William Shakespeare, dir. Gianfranco De Bosio with Sergio Fantoni, Andrea Giordana, Massimo Dapporto, Pino Ferrara, Lina Sastri, Bruno Zanin, Vittorio Stagni, Ilaria Occhini, Massimo Foschi, Gianrico Tedeschi, Antonio Garrani, Loris Loddi, (aired on March 24, 1979).

Theatre
1974: Goldoni - La putta onorata and la buona moglie
1975: Goldoni - Il Campiello
1979: Shakespeare - Il Mercante di Venezia
1982: Goldoni - I pettegolezzi delle donne
1989: Goldoni - Il Ventaglio

Writing
2006: Nobody must know (ed. Tullio Pironti)

References
 Nessuno dovrà saperlo, Zanin's book 
 
chữa bệnh trĩ bằng quả sung

External links
 An open letter (in Italian) to Bruno about the revelations about pedophile priests in his book
 Interview (in Italian) to Stefano Lorenzetto in the Il Giornale newspaper, where he talks about his book
 
 Literature site in Spanish language
 Bruno Zanin testimonial on the pedophile priest Don Gelmini (in Italian) - part 1
 Bruno Zanin testimonial on the pedophile priest Don Gelmini (in Italian) - part 2
 Picture from the film Amarcord
 Review of his book (in Italian)

1951 births
Living people
Italian male film actors
Italian male stage actors
Italian male writers
Italian male television actors